Mound of Butter is a still life painting of a mound of butter, by the 19th-century French realist painter Antoine Vollon made between 1875 and 1885. The painting is in the National Gallery of Art in Washington D.C., with the New York Times calling it one of "Washington’s Crown Jewels".

Painter
Throughout his career, Vollon was best known as a painter of still lifes, this including his landscapes and figures. He was part of the French Realist movement, and in his lifetime achieved celebrity status, earning a number of prestigious awards such as the Legion of Honor, and declared "the Chardin of his day" (alluding to the French master of still life paintings, Jean-Baptiste-Siméon Chardin). In the late nineteenth century, Vollon's paintings maintained popularity, and thus many of his works are in private collections today. French writer Alexandre Dumas, fils and fellow American painter William Merritt Chase, for example, collected his various artworks.

Vollon was a member of the Académie des Beaux-Arts, and his works were present at the Paris Salon for over thirty years, together with other realist French painters like Charles-François Daubigny, Alexandre-Gabriel Decamps, Jean-Baptiste-Camille Corot, Henri Fantin-Latour and Eugène Boudin, but Vollon is not quite as celebrated or remembered today as his other French Realist colleagues such as Corot and Fantin-Latour.

Painting
The painting is a great example of Vollon's still life art, depicting a mound of butter, coloured in rich, deep yellow colour (presumably from the carotene of the fresh plants that grazing cows commonly eat on barn fields). At the time when Antoine Vollon lived, it was usual to purchase the butter from the farmer, handmade. 

Typically, after milking, the cream is to be collected, churned and the butter lumps are kneaded by hand or worked with a spatula to get rid of the moisture from it, because the high amounts of buttermilk would shorten its storage life. Back then, butter was usually stored wrapped in a cheesecloth, in a cool place. In the painting, the butter mound's cloth is falling loosely over a couple of eggs beside it.

The painting also has thick marks layered on top of the artist's brush-work, probably meant to illustrate the marks after the butter knife was used to spread butter with; or the wooden spatula, used to spread the butter with and also used in producing the butter. Kitchen scenes, food preparation, and depiction of everyday objects were a usual subject for still lifes in Vollon's time.

See also
Impressionism
Still life
Butter

References

French paintings
1870s paintings
Collections of the National Gallery of Art
Still life paintings
Food and drink paintings